Hardisty Airport  is a registered aerodrome located  southwest of Hardisty, Alberta, Canada.

References

External links

CWOP Site Information for CEA5
Town of Hardisty (Official Website)

Registered aerodromes in Alberta
Flagstaff County